Dipsas pavonina, the northern snail-eater, is a non-venomous snake found in Guyana, Suriname, French Guiana, Venezuela, Brazil, Colombia, Bolivia, Ecuador, and Peru.

References

Dipsas
Snakes of South America
Reptiles of Venezuela
Reptiles of Colombia
Reptiles of Brazil
Reptiles described in 1837
Taxa named by Hermann Schlegel